The 1990 United States Senate election in Illinois was held on November 6, 1990. Incumbent Democratic U.S. Senator Paul Simon sought re-election to a second term in office. Simon was opposed by Republican nominee Lynn Morley Martin, a U.S. Congresswoman from Illinois's 16th congressional district, whom he easily defeated to win a second and final term in the Senate.

Primaries were held March 20, 1990.

Election information
The primaries and general elections coincided with those for House, as well as those for state offices.

Turnout
For the primaries, turnout was 23.02%, with 1,384,324 votes cast. For the general election, turnout was 53.90%, with 3,251,005 votes cast.

Democratic primary

Republican primary

General election

Candidates 
 Paul Simon (D), incumbent United States Senator
 Lynn Morley Martin (R), United States Congresswoman from Illinois's 16th congressional district

Results

See also 
 1990 United States Senate elections

References 

Illinois
1990
1990 Illinois elections